"King of the World" is a song by American contemporary Christian music singer and songwriter Natalie Grant. It was released on April 29, 2016, as the second single from her ninth studio album, Be One (2015). The song was written by Grant, Becca Mizell, and Sam Mizell.

Accolades
The song was nominated for the Best Contemporary Christian Music Performance/Song at the 59th Annual Grammy Awards.

Charts

Release history

References

2016 singles
2016 songs
Curb Records singles
Natalie Grant songs
Songs written by Sam Mizell